EKU or Eku may refer to:

 Eku, Delta, a town in Nigeria
 Eku Edewor (born 1986), Nigerian actress
 Earliest known use, in philately
 Eastern Kentucky University, a public, regional comprehensive, post-secondary institution in Richmond, Kentucky, United States
 European Karate Union, now the European Karate Federation
 Evangelical Church of the Union, a defunct German Christian denomination
 EKU, a former German brewery, now a brand of Kulmbacher Brewery